William Bruce Norman (4 March 1932 – 25 November 2009) was a New Zealand cricketer. He played twenty first-class matches for Auckland between 1959 and 1963.

See also
 List of Auckland representative cricketers

References

External links
 

1932 births
2009 deaths
New Zealand cricketers
Auckland cricketers
Cricketers from Auckland